Sandra Teixeira (born 13 March 1978) is a Portuguese athlete specialising in the middle distance events. She represented her country at four World Indoor Championships.

Competition record

Personal bests
Outdoor
800 metres – 2:01.55 (Salamanca 2006)
1000 metres – 2:42.35 (Lisbon 2004)
1500 metres – 4:10.28 (Leiria 2005)
3000 metres – 9:08.85 (Castellón 2009)
3000 metres steeplechase – 10:00.69 (Huelva 2008)
Indoor
800 metres – 2:02.47 (Espinho 2001)
1000 metres – 2:43.92 (Lisbon 2002)
1500 metres – 4:10.84 (Karlsruhe 2005)
3000 metres – 9:12.15 (Pombal 2009)

References

1978 births
Living people
Portuguese female middle-distance runners
Portuguese female steeplechase runners
Competitors at the 2003 Summer Universiade
Competitors at the 2005 Summer Universiade